The Greater Vancouver Food Bank is a Canadian registered charity located in Vancouver, BC. Their mission is to create empowering environments that provide and promote access to healthy food, education and training.

History 
The Greater Vancouver Food Bank (GVFB) was established in 1983 when organizations, church groups and concerned citizens joined together in response to the hunger crisis during the economic recession in 1981. The original purpose of the GVFB was to be a temporary social service provider. However, because the number of those at risk of hunger has continued to increase, the GVFB has become one of the most important non-government funded food assistance providers in Canada. In 1982, the GVFB assisted 200 people.

Internal Programs

Community Food Hubs 
The Greater Vancouver Food Bank serves Vancouver, Burnaby, New Westminster and the North Shore. The GVFB provides direct support to clients at 4 distribution locations each week in addition to partnering with 119 agencies to assist with sharing food with those in need.

See also

 List of food banks

External links
 

Non-profit organizations based in Vancouver
Food banks in Canada